Lucas Gabriel Masoero Masi (born 1 February 1995) is an Argentine professional footballer who plays as a centre-back for Russian club Pari NN.

Club career
In June 2018, he joined Bulgarian First League club Lokomotiv Plovdiv on a free transfer from Deportivo Maipú. He began his career with Independiente Rivadavia, but left for Deportivo Maipú in 2017.

On 10 July 2021, he signed a two-year contract with Russian Premier League club Nizhny Novgorod. On 18 December 2022, Masoero extended his contract until 2025.

Honours

Club
Lokomotiv Plovdiv
 Bulgarian Cup (2): 2018–19, 2019–20
 Bulgarian Supercup: 2020

Career statistics

References

External links

1995 births
Sportspeople from Mendoza, Argentina
Living people
Argentine footballers
Association football defenders
Independiente Rivadavia footballers
Deportivo Maipú players
PFC Lokomotiv Plovdiv players
FC Nizhny Novgorod (2015) players
Primera Nacional players
Torneo Federal A players
First Professional Football League (Bulgaria) players
Russian Premier League players
Argentine expatriate footballers
Argentine expatriate sportspeople in Bulgaria
Expatriate footballers in Bulgaria
Argentine expatriate sportspeople in Russia
Expatriate footballers in Russia